Lusaka Central is a constituency of the National Assembly of Zambia. It covers the central and eastern parts of Lusaka.

List of MPs

Election results

2011

References

Constituencies of the National Assembly of Zambia
Lusaka
Constituencies established in 1948
1948 establishments in Northern Rhodesia